Paul Pape (born July 17, 1952) is an American actor. He is known for the role of Double J in the 1977 film Saturday Night Fever. Post Saturday Night Fever, he has appeared in over 20 films. He also played a supporting role in the 2008 racing video game Need for Speed: Undercover as Lt. Jack M. Keller.

Filmography

Film
 Antz - Soldier Ants (voice)
 Bolt - Man (voice)
 Cats & Dogs - Wolf Blitzer (voice)
 Chicken Little - Fire Chief (voice)
 China: The Panda Adventure - Bill Harkness Voice-over (voice)
 Dragon Nest: Warriors' Dawn - Blacksmith and Kuke (voice) 
 Frozen - Crowd Member #1 (voice)
 Incredibles 2 - Additional Voices (voice)
 Madagascar - Crowd Member (voice)
 Monsters vs. Aliens - Soldiers (voice)
 Missing Link - New Worlder (voice)
 Osmosis Jones - Male Red Blood Cell #2 (voice)
 Saturday Night Fever - Double J.
 Shrek - Lord Farquaad's Guards (voice)
 Spirit: Stallion of the Cimarron - Colonel's Soldiers (voice)
 Tangled - Man #4 (voice)
 The Desperate Hour - Lyft Driver
 The Emoji Movie - Additional Voices (voice)
 The Road to El Dorado - Cortes's Guards (voice)
 The Tale of Despereaux - Man in crowd (voice)
 The Wild - Man (voice)
 Wreck-It Ralph - Man at Arcade (voice)

Television
 Angie - Vinnie Visicio
 Caprica - Rhetoric Host #2
 Family - Clyde
 GameStar: Die Redaktion - Lt. Jack M. Keller
 Hagen - Stewart
 Hart to Hart - Burt Kroll
 Journeyman - Julius
 Resurrection Blvd. - Detective Wilson
 The Man in the High Castle - Film Narrator (voice)
 Wanda at Large - Voiceover

References

External links

1952 births
Living people
20th-century American male actors
21st-century American male actors
American male film actors
American male television actors
American male voice actors
Male actors from New York (state)
People from Rochester, New York